Zahid Ismayil oghlu Khalilov (14 January 1911, Sarachly – 4 February 1974, Baku) was an Azerbaijani mathematician (Professor since 1946) and engineer. Being the founder of Azerbaijani functional analysis school, he was elected President of the Azerbaijan Mathematical Society. Khalilov solved the boundary value problem for polyharmonic equations, proposed abstract generalizations of singular integral operators and made some other contributions.
 
In 1955, Khalilov became a member of Azerbaijan National Academy of Sciences. In 1957—1959 he was its Vice-Chairman and Chairman in 1961–1967. A street in Baku is named after him.

Researches
Khalilov was first to consider the abstract equation with an operator satisfying the condition Q2 = I, within the framework of normed rings. The associated theory was a direct treatment of the singular integral equations theory with continuous coefficients within the subject of an abstract normed ring. Khalilov had also translated the Noether's theorem to the case of abstract singular equations in a normed ring R ux + vS(x) + T(x) = y and gave a general theory of regularizers.

Khalilov also investigated the problems of subterranean hydromechanics applied in development of oil and gas deposits.

References

External links
Profile at the Baku State University site

1911 births
1974 deaths
20th-century Azerbaijani mathematicians
People from Tiflis Governorate
Academic staff of Baku State University
Tbilisi State University alumni
Full Members of the USSR Academy of Sciences
Sixth convocation members of the Supreme Soviet of the Soviet Union
Seventh convocation members of the Supreme Soviet of the Soviet Union
Recipients of the Order of the Red Banner of Labour
Azerbaijani mathematicians
Soviet mathematicians
Burials at Alley of Honor